SM U-52 was one of 329 submarines serving in the Imperial German Navy in World War I.
U-52 was engaged in the naval warfare and took part in the First Battle of the Atlantic.

Thirty-eight men were lost.

The sinking of Nottingham was an important event in the German Imperial Navy's action of August 19.

At that time Otto Ciliax was watch officer on board the submarine. He later became an admiral in the Kriegsmarine.

All 648 men were lost as the torpedo ignited a magazine and the ship sank within seconds.

U-52 was surrendered to the Allies at Harwich on 21 November 1918 in accordance with the requirements of the Armistice with Germany. She was sold by the British Admiralty to George Cohen on 3 March 1919 for £2,400 (£ in ) (excluding her engines), and was broken up at Swansea.

Summary of raiding history

References

Notes

Citations

Bibliography

World War I submarines of Germany
1915 ships
U-boats commissioned in 1916
Ships built in Kiel
Type U 51 submarines